Taiwanasteridae is a family of echinoderms belonging to the order Clypeasteroida.

Genera:
 Sinaechinocyamus Liao, 1979
 Taiwanaster Wang, 1984

References

Clypeasteroida
Echinoderm families